Mathias "Mini" Mabergs (also known as Mathias Carlsson; born 10 May 1975) is a Swedish curler and curling coach.

Teams

Mixed

Record as a coach of national teams

Private life
He is from a curling family; his brother Joakim Mabergs (né Carlsson) is a curler.

References

External links
 
 Mabergs Curlingblogg - En curlingblogg med trevliga curlinghändelser i familjen Mabergs närhet 
 Lag – Malung Curling Club 

Living people
1975 births
Swedish male curlers
Swedish curling champions
Swedish curling coaches
20th-century Swedish people